A theatre practitioner is someone who creates theatrical performances and/or produces a theoretical discourse that informs his or her practical work. A theatre practitioner may be a director, dramatist, actor, designer or a combination of these traditionally separate roles. Theatre practice describes the collective work that various theatre practitioners do.

The term was not ordinarily applied to theatre-makers prior to the rise of modernism in the theatre. Instead, theatre praxis from Konstantin Stanislavski's development of his system is described through Vsevolod Meyerhold's biomechanics, Antonin Artaud's Theatre of cruelty, Bertolt Brecht's epic, and Jerzy Grotowski's poor theatre. Contemporary theatre practitioners include Augusto Boal with his Theatre of the Oppressed, Dario Fo's popular theatre, Eugenio Barba's theatre anthropology, and Anne Bogart's viewpoints.

References

Footnotes

Bibliography

 Counsell, Colin. 1996. Signs of Performance: An Introduction to Twentieth-Century Theatre. London and New York: Routledge. .
 McCullough, Christopher, ed. 1998. Theatre Praxis: Teaching Drama Through Practice. New Directions in Theatre Ser. London: Macmillan. . New York: St Martin's P. .
 McCullough, Christopher. 1996. Theatre and Europe (1957–1996). Intellect European Studies ser. Exeter: Intellect. .
 Milling, Jane, and Graham Ley. 2001. Modern Theories of Performance: From Stanislavski to Boal. Basingstoke, Hampshire and New York: Palgrave. .
 Pavis, Patrice. 1998. Dictionary of the Theatre: Terms, Concepts, and Analysis. Trans. Christine Shantz. Toronto and Buffalo: U of Toronto P. .

 
 
20th-century theatre
Entertainment occupations
Mass media occupations
Theatrical occupations